Ghartey may refer to:

Jay Ghartey, Ghanaian-American music producer, singer, and songwriter
Joe Ghartey, Ghanaian lawyer and politician